Louis Meyer (1904-1995) was an American racing driver.

Louis Meyer is the name of:
 Louis Meyer (1843-1929), Danish businessman
 Louis Meyer (1796–1869), Polish poet
 Louis A. Meyer (1942–2014), American writer generally known as L.A. Meyer
 Louis B. Meyer (1933–1999), American jurist

See also
 Louis B. Mayer (1884–1957), film producer of MGM